Hans-Ulrich Grapenthin (also spelled Hans-Ullrich Grapenthin, born 2 September 1943) is a German former footballer who played as a goalkeeper for FC Carl Zeiss Jena in 308 Oberliga matches. He was an East Germany international between 1975 and 1981, winning 21 caps, and was part of the gold-medal winning squad at the 1976 Olympics. He was East German Footballer of the Year in 1980 and 1981.

References

External links 
 databaseOlympics

1943 births
Living people
People from Wolgast
People from the Province of Pomerania
German footballers
East German footballers
Footballers from Mecklenburg-Western Pomerania
East Germany international footballers
Association football goalkeepers
FC Carl Zeiss Jena players
DDR-Oberliga players
Olympic footballers of East Germany
Footballers at the 1976 Summer Olympics
Olympic gold medalists for East Germany
Olympic medalists in football
Medalists at the 1976 Summer Olympics
Recipients of the Patriotic Order of Merit in bronze
People from Bezirk Rostock